The Volvo Environment Prize is an annual international award originating in Sweden. The prize is awarded to individuals who "explore the way to a sustainable world." The prize is awarded by the independent foundation The Volvo Environment Prize Foundation instituted 1989.
A recipient of the Volvo Environment Prize receives an original diploma by Swedish artist Göran Dahlbom, a glass sculpture and a cash award for SEK 1.5 million.

Organisation
The responsibility for selecting the laureate or laureates of the annual Volvo Environment Prize for recommendation to the Board of the Foundation lies with an international Prize Jury.
The Jury currently consists of Professor Will Steffen, chair (Australia National University), Professor Mary Scholes ( University of the Witwatersrand, South Africa), Professor Peijun Shi (Beijing Normal University, China), Professor Kazuhiko Takeuchi (University of Tokyo, Japan) and Dr. Sybille van den Hove (Autonomous University of Barcelona, Spain).

The Royal Society of Arts and Sciences in Gothenburg, Sweden has appointed a Scientific Committee. The Scientific Committee makes the initial screening and evaluation of candidates which are presented to the Prize Jury.

Laureates
Since the first award in 1990, the prize has gone to 38 individuals. Among them are many well-known names and three Nobel Prize winners. The laureates represent all fields of environmental and sustainability studies and initiatives.
2021 Professor Paul Anastas
2020 Professor Claire Kremen
2019 Professor Terry Chapin
2018 Professor Xuemei Bai
2017 Professor Rashid Sumaila
2016 Professor Carlos Nobre
2015  
2014 Professor Eric Lambin
2013 Qin Dahe
2012 Professor Gretchen Daily 
2011 Professor Hans Joachim Schellnhuber 
2010 Harold A. Mooney
2009 Dr. Susan Solomon
2008 Professor C. S. Holling
2007 Amory Lovins
2006 Professor Ray Hilborn, Professor Daniel Pauly and Professor Carl Walters
2005 Dr. Mary T. Kalin Arroyo and Professor Aila Inkeri Keto
2004 Dr. David Satterthwaite, Jamie Lerner, Dr. Luisa Molina and Dr. Mario Molina
2003 Professor Madhav Gadgil and Professor Muhammad Yunus
2002 Partha Dasgupta and Karl-Göran Mäler
2001 Dr. George M. Woodwell
2000 Professor José Goldemberg, Dr. Thomas B. Johansson, Professor Amulya Kumar N. Reddy and Dr. Robert H. Williams
1999 Dr. M. S. Swaminathan,
1998 Professor David Schindler, Professor Malin Falkenmark
1997 Dr. Syukuro Manabe and Dr. Veerabhadran Ramanathan
1996 Dr. James Lovelock
1995 Professor Gilbert F. White
1994 Professor Gita Sen
1993 Professor Paul R. Ehrlich and Professor John P. Holdren
1992 Dr. Norman Myers and Professor Peter H. Raven
1991 Professor Paul Crutzen
1990 Professor John V. Krutilla and Professor Allen V. Kneese

See also

 List of environmental awards

References

External links
 Volvo Environment Prize
 Prize Blog: Exploring the way to a sustainable future

Swedish awards
Environmental awards
Volvo
Awards established in 1990
1990 establishments in Sweden